The 112th New York State Legislature, consisting of the New York State Senate and the New York State Assembly, met from January 1 to May 16, 1889, during the fifth year of David B. Hill's governorship, in Albany.

Background
Under the provisions of the New York Constitution of 1846, 32 Senators and 128 assemblymen were elected in single-seat districts; senators for a two-year term, assemblymen for a one-year term. The senatorial districts were made up of entire counties, except New York County (seven districts) and Kings County (three districts). The Assembly districts were made up of entire towns, or city wards, forming a contiguous area, all within the same county.

At this time there were two major political parties: the Democratic Party and the Republican Party. The "United Labor" organization endorsed the Republican nominee for governor Warner Miller, but nominated own candidates for the other offices. The Prohibition Party and the Socialist Labor Party also nominated state tickets.

Elections
The New York state election, 1888 was held on November 6. Gov. David B. Hill and Lt. Gov. Edward F. Jones (both Dem.) were re-elected. The only other statewide elective office up for election was also carried by a Democrat. The approximate party strength at this election, as expressed by the vote for governor, was: Democrats 650,000; Republicans/United Labor 631,000; Prohibition 30,000; and Socialist Labor 3,500.

Sessions
The Legislature met for the regular session at the State Capitol in Albany on January 1, 1889; and adjourned on May 16.

Fremont Cole (R) was re-elected Speaker with 76 votes against 47 for William F. Sheehan (D).

Jacob Sloat Fassett (R) was elected president pro tempore of the State Senate.

On January 18, a grand jury in Albany refused to indict Assemblyman Charles Smith for perjury. The New York City Reform Club had accused Smith of having obtained his election by buying votes.

State Senate

Districts

Note: There are now 62 counties in the State of New York. The counties which are not mentioned in this list had not yet been established, or sufficiently organized, the area being included in one or more of the abovementioned counties.

Members
The asterisk (*) denotes members of the previous Legislature who continued in office as members of this Legislature.

Employees
 Clerk: John S. Kenyon
 Sergeant-at-Arms: John W. Corning
 Doorkeeper: Charles V. Schram
 Assistant Doorkeeper: Hiram Van Tassel
 Stenographer: Harris A. Corell

State Assembly

Assemblymen
The asterisk (*) denotes members of the previous Legislature who continued as members of this Legislature.

Employees
 Clerk: Charles A. Chickering
 Sergeant-at-Arms: Owel H. Willard
 Doorkeeper: Homer B. Webb
 First Assistant Doorkeeper: John R. Harlow
 Second Assistant Doorkeeper: W. B. Clark
 Stenographer: George H. Thornton

Notes

Sources
 The New York Red Book compiled by Edgar L. Murlin (published by James B. Lyon, Albany NY, 1897; see pg. 384f for senate districts; pg. 403 for senators; pg. 410–417 for Assembly districts; and pg. 507 for assemblymen)
 THE STATE LEGISLATURE in NYT on January 2, 1889
 THE EXCISE BILL PASSED in the New York Press on April 4, 1889

112
1889 in New York (state)
1889 U.S. legislative sessions